Birzenbach is a river of Rhineland-Palatinate, Germany. It springs west of Hardert. It flows southward and discharges at the eastern outskirts of Rengsdorf into the Engelsbach from the right.

See also
List of rivers of Rhineland-Palatinate

References

Rivers of Rhineland-Palatinate
Rivers of Germany